Allcures Group is a pharmacy chain in the UK, with an online presence and a range of outlets in the south east of England.

History
Allcures was established in 1981 by Jai Cheema, who founded a series of pharmacies across Essex and North London. In 2003, the company moved from its offices in Stanford-le-Hope to new premises in South Ockendon, which incorporated the warehouse and head office department. 

In 1999, the online branch of the business was established, becoming the first fully functioning online pharmacy in the UK. In a 2001 interview with the Financial Times, the chairman, Jai Cheema, stated that the focus of the company would be on “clicks and mortar”. 

Despite concerns from the media that the company would break ethical codes, and therefore be unable to deliver prescription only drugs, the Royal Pharmaceutical Society allowed the company to do so, under stringent checks. In 2006, Allcures.com was invited to join the  group, made up of elite internet based companies, in recognition of their brand leading status. The Daily Mirror also recommended the shop in 2011, describing the company as “the online equivalent of a high street chemist”.

References

External links
 Official website

Pharmacies of the United Kingdom
Pharmacy brands